Alice H. Parker 1895 – 1920 was an African-American inventor known for her patent for a gas furnace.

Early life 
Alice H. Parker was born in 1895 in Morristown, New Jersey, where she grew up some of her life. Parker was a highly educated woman who graduated with honors in 1910 from Howard University Academy, a historically African-American university that accepted both male and female students since its founding in November 1866, shortly after the Civil War. According to census data, Parker worked as a cook in the kitchen in Morristown, NJ and lived with her husband, who was a butler. Despite her revolutionary impact on today's modern heating system, there is almost no information recorded on her personal life. Although the specific date of her death is unknown, it is thought she died in 1920 due to a fire or heat stroke.  

In 2022, an investigation by Audrey Henderson of the Energy News Network found that a photo commonly attributed to Parker is actually of an unrelated white woman born five years after Parker's furnace patent was issued.

Invention
At the time, central gas heating had yet to be developed, so people relied on burning coal or wood as their main source of heating. While furnaces and the concept of central heating have been around since the Roman Empire, the science hardly advanced in the years that followed, and the heating methods utilized by the end of the nineteenth century were still relatively primitive in nature.

Parker felt that the fireplace alone was not enough to keep her and her home warm during the cold Jersey winter, and went on to design the first gas furnace that was powered by natural gas and the first heating system to contain individually controlled air ducts that distributed heat evenly throughout the building. In more technical terms, Parker's heating system used independently controlled burner units that drew in cold air and conveyed the heat through a heat exchanger. This air was then fed into individual ducts to control the amount of heat in different areas. What made her invention particularly unique, was that it was a form of "zone heating" where temperature can be moderated in different parts of a building.

Although the invention had massive positive impacts, it also came with a few downsides. Her design posed a few health and safety risks as it made certain appliances like the oven more flammable and unsafe to touch. The regulation of the heat flow also posed a few security risks. On the other hand, Parkers invention also decreased the risk of house or building fires that heating units posed by eliminating the need to leave a burning fireplace on throughout the night.  With her idea for a furnace used with modifications to eliminate safety concerns, it inspired and led the way to features such as thermostats, zone heating and forced air furnaces, which are common features of modern central heating. Additionally, by using natural gas, it heated homes much more efficiently than wood or coal counterparts (which were more time consuming and expensive). Parker's invention was further improved in 1935 by scientists who created forced convection wall heaters that use a coal furnace, electric fan, and ductwork throughout a home. Nowadays, homes utilize thermostats and forced air furnaces which can be attributed to Parker's design and invention of the central heating furnace. Her filing of the patent precedes both the Civil Rights Movement and the Women's Liberation Movement, which made her accomplishments especially impressive, as it removed many barriers for black women of her generation.

Legacy
In 2019, the National Society of Black Physicists honored Parker as an "African American inventor famous for her patented system of central heating using natural gas." It called her invention a "revolutionary idea" for the 1920s, "that conserved energy and paved the way for the central heating systems". The New Jersey Chamber of Commerce established the Alice H. Parker Women Leaders in Innovation Awards to honor women who use their "talent, hard work and ‘outside-the-box’ thinking to create economic opportunities and help make New Jersey a better place to live and work."

References 

19th-century births
African-American inventors
20th-century American inventors
Women inventors
People from Morristown, New Jersey
1920 deaths
20th-century African-American people